USS Hazard (AM-240) is an  that served in the United States Navy during World War II.

Service history
Hazard was launched on 1 October 1944 and was commissioned on 30 December 1944.  The vessel was built by the Winslow Marine Railway and Shipbuilding Company of Winslow, Washington. Hazard was fitted for both wire and acoustic sweeping and could double as an anti-submarine warfare platform.  The Admirable class of minesweepers were also used for patrol and escort duties.

Hazard first served in this capacity, escorting a convoy from San Francisco to Pearl Harbor, and then running with convoys to Eniwetok and Ulithi.  In March 1945, the minesweeper was sent to Okinawa, where she first performed anti-submarine patrols before sweeping the waters off Kerama Retto in keeping with the minesweeper's slogan, "No Sweep, No Invasion."

At the war's end the ship cleared the seas off Korea and Japan for the occupation forces.

Returning to the United States in 1946, Hazard was decommissioned and joined the reserve fleet. Stricken from the Navy Register in 1971, Hazard was purchased by a group of Omaha, Nebraska, businessmen and placed on public display. She also bears the camouflage paint she had during World War II. She is open to the public along with the submarine , an A-4 Skyhawk, an A-7 Corsair II, and an HH-52A Seaguard US Coast Guard helicopter at Freedom Park on the Missouri River waterfront in East Omaha.

Hazard earned three battle stars for her World War II service.

Hazard is a National Historic Landmark, the only Admirable-class minesweeper left in the United States.  Her sister ship,  was a museum ship in St. Louis until she was destroyed in the Great Flood of 1993.

See also
 List of Admirable class minesweepers

References

External links

Admirable-class minesweepers
Ships built in Winslow, Washington
1944 ships
World War II minesweepers of the United States
Museum ships in Nebraska
National Historic Landmarks in Nebraska
National Register of Historic Places in Omaha, Nebraska
Ships on the National Register of Historic Places in Nebraska
Museums in Omaha, Nebraska
Military and war museums in Nebraska